Dlhé Pole is a village and municipality in Žilina District in the Žilina Region of northern Slovakia.

History
In historical records the village was first mentioned in 1320. In 1385, it was referred as Langenfelt vel Dlwhe Pole, in 1796 as Hosszú Mező/Dluhe Pole. Until 1899, it was officially called as Dlhepole, when it was renamed as Trencsénhosszúmező.

Geography
The municipality lies at an altitude of 392 metres and covers an area of 41.025 km². It has a population of about 2039 people.

Genealogical resources

The records for genealogical research are available at the state archive "Statny Archiv in Bytca, Slovakia"

 Roman Catholic church records (births/marriages/deaths): 1690-1905 (parish A))

See also
 List of municipalities and towns in Slovakia

External links
https://web.archive.org/web/20071116010355/http://www.statistics.sk/mosmis/eng/run.html
Surnames of living people in Dlhe Pole

Villages and municipalities in Žilina District